The Singapore Cooperation Programme (SCP) is a series of programmes conducted by the Government of Singapore to facilitate the sharing with other developing countries the technical and systems skills that Singapore has learned and acquired over the years. 

Technical assistance focuses on training and increasing the skills of a nation. As a country whose only resource is its people, Singapore believes human resource development is vital for economic and social progress. Singapore had also benefited from technical assistance from other countries and international organisations.

Beginnings
In the 1970s, Singapore started to exchange its experiences with friends around the world through various programmes.  These programmes were brought under a single framework when the Singapore Cooperation Programme (SCP) was established in 1992 under the Technical Cooperation Directorate (TCD) of the Ministry of Foreign Affairs.  Through the SCP, Singapore has been sharing its development experience through courses, seminars, workshops, consultancy as well as hosting study visits in a range of fields.

Areas of interest
The main fields of training include Education, Law and Judiciary, Sustainable Development, Communications and Transport, Economic Development and Trade Promotion, Healthcare, Public Administration and Digital Government.

As of January 2017, more than 112,000 officials from 170 countries have been trained.

Types of assistance
To ensure recipients receive the best training possible, the SCP training programmes are divided into two types of assistance:

Bilateral Training Programmes
Bilateral training programmes are offered directly to a developing country on a government-to-government basis.  Technical assistance programmes are designed to meet the needs of the recipient country.

The training programmes under this arrangement include the Asean Training Awards, the Singapore Cooperation Programme Training Awards and the Small Island Developing States Technical Cooperation Programme.

Joint Training Programmes
Joint training programmes are provided in collaboration with other countries, international organisations and non-government organisations.  Training provided under such an arrangement is known as a Third Country Training Programme (TCTP). Harnessing the joint expertise of both Singapore and its partner countries and organisations, training programmes are customised to suit the needs of developing countries.

Some of the TCTP partners include Australia, Canada, European Commission, France, Germany, Japan, The Holy See, the Republic of Korea, Luxembourg, New Zealand, Norway, Thailand, the Asia Development Bank, Commonwealth of Learning, Colombo Plan Secretariat, Commonwealth Secretariat, Economic and Social Commission for Asia and the Pacific, Hanns Seidel Foundation, International Atomic Energy Agency, International Civil Aviation Organisation, International Maritime Organisation, International Monetary Fund, United Nations Children's Fund, United Nations Development Programme, US Vietnam Trade Council, World Bank, World Health Organisation, World Intellectual Property Organisation and World Trade Organisation. More Information on collaborations with TCTP Partners can be found from Pages XXX.

Initiative For ASEAN Integration
At the Fourth ASEAN Informal Summit held in Singapore in November 2000, then Prime Minister Goh Chok Tong launched the “Initiative for ASEAN Integration” (IAI). This framework encompasses a variety of human resource development programmes and aims to assist the integration of the new member countries (Cambodia, Lao PDR, Myanmar and Vietnam) into ASEAN.  Singapore has made four pledges to the IAI totalling about S$170 million.

More than 30,000 government officials have participated in IAI programmes. Since 2002, the four IAI training centres  in Cambodia, Laos, Burma and Vietnam have been offering in-country training courses for government officials in a wide variety of fields, including English Language, Economic Development, Public Administration, Trade and Tourism.

Small Island Developing States Technical Cooperation Programme
At the UN General Assembly 22nd special session in 1999, Singapore launched the Small Island Developing States Technical Cooperation Programme (SIDSTEC).  This five-year programme was part of Singapore's contributions to sustainable development of Small Island Developing States (SIDS).  SIDSTEC covered topics such as urban development and environmental management, which were in close alignment to the 1994 Barbados Programme of Action.  In 2005, Singapore's Minister for Environment and Water Resources Dr Yaacob Ibrahim announced the indefinite extension of SIDSTEC at the International Meeting to Review the Implementation of the Programme of Action for the Sustainable Development of SIDS.  Through SIDSTEC and its extension, SIDSTEC II, have seen more than 700 officials from 41 SIDS attend more than 150 courses.

About Singapore's Third Country Training Programme Partners
Third Country Training Programme with Developed Countries

Singapore – Australia Trilateral Cooperation Programme

Established in 1996, the Singapore – Australia Trilateral Cooperation Programme (SATCP) focuses on providing training to help close the developmental gap in Asean. To date, Singapore and Australia (administered by the Australian Agency for International Development or AusAID) have jointly conducted 11 courses for 218 Asean government officials, in areas such as customs training, civil aviation, international trade law, disaster response and maritime security. In 2007, the SATCP will be opened to participants from the Pacific region.

Singapore – Canada Third Country Training Programme

Although the Memorandum of Understanding for the Singapore – Canada Third Country Training Programme was signed in 1998, technical cooperation between Singapore and Canada dates back to 1995, when both countries launched an English Language Training Project for Cambodia, Lao PDR and Vietnam.  Singapore and Canada (administered by the Canadian International Development Agency or CIDA) have jointly conducted more than 60 activities for 1,355 participants from 16 countries.  Besides language training, courses have covered a wide variety of other areas including governance, trade and finance.

Singapore – European Commission Trilateral Cooperation Programme

Singapore is the first Southeast Asian country to work with the European Commission (EC) on a technical assistance programme for developing countries. The agreement between Singapore and the EC covers Cambodia, Lao PDR and Vietnam. Since the establishment of the Trilateral Cooperation Programme (TCP) in 2004, a total of 114 officials have been trained in areas such as finance, trade promotion, WTO matters and information technology.

Singapore – France Third Country Training Programme

Singapore and France have been cooperating to provide training to third countries since 2001.  Four joint activities have been conducted to date for ASEAN countries in areas such as public finance management, tax policy and the prevention and management of contagious diseases.

Singapore – Germany Third Country Training Programme

Established in 1993 with the Deutsche Gesellschaft für Technische Zusammenarbeit (GTZ), the Singapore – Germany Third Country Training Programme has provided 26 courses to date for 370 participants from the Asia-Pacific region.  Training has been provided in areas such as the management of technical and vocational training institutions, multimedia development, manufacturing and automation, information technology and enterprise management.

Japan – Singapore Partnership Programme for the 21st Century

Since 1994, Singapore and Japan have been co-operating in human resource development for third countries under the Japan – Singapore Partnership Programme for the 21st Century.  To date, Singapore and Japan (administered by the Japan International Cooperation Agency or JICA) have jointly trained more than 3,000 officials from all major regions of the world.  Singapore and JICA have jointly organised 186 courses covering diverse areas like information technology, trade promotion, industrial development, healthcare, education, urban planning and the environment.

Singapore – Republic of Korea Third Country Training Programme

The Memorandum of Understanding for the Singapore –Republic of Korea Third Country Training Programme was signed in 1993. Singapore and Korea (administered by the Korea International Cooperation Agency or KOICA) have jointly conducted 46 courses for 768 participants from the Asia-Pacific region. Our joint training courses cover areas such as tourism, trade, information technology, environment, port management and the protection of intellectual property.

Singapore – Luxembourg Third Country Training Programme

The Singapore – Luxembourg Third Country Training Programme was launched in 1997 to provide joint technical assistance to countries from the Asia-Pacific region. To date, 5 courses have been conducted for 83 participants, covering the areas of healthcare, tourism and public administration.

Singapore – New Zealand Third Country Training Programme

Joint Training with New Zealand was launched in 2003 under the framework of the Initiative for Asean Integration (IAI).  Singapore and New Zealand (administered by the New Zealand Agency for International Development or NZAID) have conducted a series of 4 training courses on various aspects of WTO Accession at the IAI Training Centres in Cambodia, Lao PDR and Vietnam.  Most recently, Singapore and NZAID have jointly sponsored a feasibility study for an English Language Training pilot project in these countries.

Singapore – Norway Third Country Training Programme

Launched in 1996, the Singapore - Norway Third Country Training Programme has provided 15 training activities for 287 participants from 14 countries. Administered by Ministry of Foreign Affairs, Singapore and the Royal Norwegian Embassy in Singapore, two courses are conducted each year in areas such as environmental management, utility management, information technology, English Language and healthcare.

Thailand – Singapore Third Country Training Programme

Since 1997, Thailand and Singapore have been cooperating to provide technical assistance under the Thailand - Singapore Third Country Training Programme (TCTP).  The TCTP was Singapore's first formalised partnership with a fellow ASEAN country in extending technical assistance to developing countries namely, Cambodia, Lao PDR and Myanmar.  Singapore and Thailand (administered by the Thailand International Development Cooperation Agency, Ministry of Foreign Affairs) have jointly trained participants in the areas of the English language, healthcare, information technology and public administration.

Singapore – Vatican Third Country Training Programme

Singapore and the Holy See began cooperation in 1996 on a pilot project to provide English language training to third countries. Following the success of this project, a Memorandum of Understanding was signed in 1998 to provide human resource training to countries in the Asia-Pacific region. To date, Singapore and the Holy See (administered by the Apostolic Nunciature based in Bangkok) have jointly sponsored 13 training courses for 126 participants from Cambodia, Lao PDR, Mongolia, East Timor and Vietnam.

Third Country Training Programme with International Organisations/Non-Government Organisations

Singapore – ADB Technical Cooperation Programme

Singapore and the Asian Development Bank (ADB) have been conducting joint training courses for developing countries under the Singapore – ADB Technical Co-operation Programme since 1991. To date, 21 joint training courses had been conducted for 515 participants in the areas of tourism, road safety management, port/airport management, water and solid waste management, technology transfer, border management and trade facilitation.

Singapore – CoL Third Country Training Programme

Singapore has been collaborating with the Commonwealth Of Learning (COL) since 2000 under the Third Country Training Programme framework to conduct one training visit per year for five consecutive years for CEOs of training institutes from Commonwealth African countries. We have jointly conducted 7 Management Development Workshop for 168 participants from the African countries and the small states of the Commonwealth.  The joint training with COL in 2007 will focus on the ICT sector.

Singapore – Colombo Plan Third Country Training Programme

Since 1961, we have been providing technical assistance to member countries under the Singapore-Colombo Plan (CP) Training Award Scheme.  Our collaboration with the CP Secretariat was formalised in November 1996.  We have jointly provided training courses for CP member countries in the fields of public administration and economic development for senior government officials. From 1997 to 2004, a total of 389 participants from 20 countries had participated in our programmes.

Singapore – Commonwealth Secretariat Third Country Training Programme

The Ministry of Foreign Affairs, Singapore and the Commonwealth Secretariat (Comsec) signed a Memorandum of Understanding in 1994 to conduct joint courses under the Third Country Training Programme for Commonwealth countries. About 11 joint courses are conducted each year in areas such as economic development, information technology, productivity management, public administration and trade promotion. To date, they have jointly trained 2,397 participants from 62 Commonwealth countries.

Singapore – ESCAP Third Country Training Programme

The Singapore – ESCAP Third Country Training Programme Memorandum of Understanding (MOU) was signed on 28 April 1997 during the 53rd Ministerial Meeting of ESCAP.  Under the MOU, Singapore and ESCAP would co-share all training expenses equally.  The training focus is on tourism, trade promotion, port management, project planning and other fields mutually agreed upon for countries in the Asia Pacific region. To date, 10 training programmes for 133 participants from 29 countries have been jointly conducted.

Singapore – HSF Third Country Training Programme

The Ministry of Foreign Affairs, Singapore and the Hanns Seidel Foundation (HSF) have been conducting joint training programmes for developing countries since 2001.  Since then, we have jointly conducted 8 courses in human resource development for a total of 135 government officials.  For 2007, Singapore and HSF will be conducting a joint course at the Vietnam – Singapore Training Centre in Hanoi.

Singapore – IAEA Third Country Training Programme

Singapore concluded a Memorandum of Understanding with the International Atomic Energy Agency (IAEA) on 22 March 2000 to jointly train participants from IAEA member states in the areas of health, radiation protection and environment.  To date, we have conducted 75 joint programmes for 113 officials from IAEA member countries under the Singapore – IAEA Third Country Training Programme. These programmes are largely fellowship attachments and visits to Singapore hospitals and universities.

Singapore – ICAO Third Country Training Programme

In August 2001, Singapore concluded a Memorandum of Understanding (MOU) with the International Civil Aviation Organisation (ICAO) to promote the safety and development of civil aviation through human capacity building. The MOU was renewed twice in January 2004 and in December 2006. To date, more than 220 fellowships have been awarded to 65 ICAO contracting states to attend specialised training programmes at the Singapore Aviation Academy.

Singapore – IMO Third Country Training Programme

Singapore and International Maritime Organisation (IMO) signed a Third Country Training Programme Memorandum of Understanding on 1 Sep 1998 to provide training and technical assistance to member countries on matters relating to maritime safety and prevention and control of marine pollution. To date we have conducted 19 training programmes for 346 participants.

Singapore – IMF Third Country Training Programme

Singapore and the International Monetary Fund (IMF) signed a Memorandum of Understanding on 22 Sept 1997 on the establishment of the IMF-Singapore Regional Training Institute (IMF-STI) in Singapore. The IMF-STI provides training for government officials from the Asia-Pacific region in the areas of macroeconomic and financial management, as well as legal and statistical subjects. Since 1998, IMF-STI has conducted 184 programmes for more than 5,186 officials from the Asia-Pacific region.

Singapore – UNICEF Third Country Training Programme

Singapore and the United Nations Children's Fund (UNICEF) have provided joint training programmes under our Third Country Training Programme (TCTP) framework established in 1991.  The Singapore – UNICEF TCTP has provided a total of 9 joint courses on Early Childhood Education to 211 participants from 19 countries. Singapore and UNICEF will expand their cooperation to help Cambodia, Lao PDR, Myanmar and Vietnam in human resource development and capacity building.

Singapore – UNDP Third Country Training Programme

Singapore's collaboration with the United Nations Development Programme (UNDP) began in 1992 under the framework of the Singapore – UNDP Third Country Training Programme.  Since 1992, 1,215 government officials from 86 countries, including countries from the Caribbean and Sub-Saharan African, have participated in our joint training programmes, in areas such as civil aviation management and environmental health.

Singapore - US Vietnam Trade Council

Singapore - US Vietnam Trade Council (USVTC) started joint training collaboration in 2003 focusing on trade, tariff and WTO accession. To date, a total of 35 Vietnamese officials from various ministries and departments have attended the workshops.
 
Singapore – World Bank Third Country Training Programme

Singapore's collaboration with the World Bank began in 1996 when both parties signed a Memorandum of Understanding (MOU) establishing a Third Country Training Programme. The joint programme allows Singapore and the World Bank to pool resources and share expertise with developing countries in areas such as environmental management, finance and banking, urban development, information technology, hospital reform and education. Since 1996, Singapore and the World Bank have jointly conducted 21 courses for 563 officials. In December 2006, Singapore and the World Bank (Africa Region) signed an MOU to conduct collaborative activities in the Africa region.

Singapore – WIPO Third Country Training Programme

Singapore and the World Intellectual Property Organization (WIPO) signed a Memorandum of Understanding in February 1997 to conduct joint training courses for developing countries.  The courses were aimed at enhancing their capacity to implement and develop international Intellectual Property (IP) standards. Last year, Singapore and WIPO renewed their partnership to expand collaborative activities.  To date, Singapore and WIPO have jointly trained 224 officials from 24 countries in the Asia- Pacific region.

Singapore – WHO Third Country Training Programme
Singapore's collaboration with the World Health Organisation (WHO) began in 2002 with the launch of the Regional Quality Management Training (QMT) course in Blood Transfusion Services. For 2007, collaboration with the WHO will be focusing on Management of National Blood Programmes.  To date, we have trained a total of 70 health officials from other countries.

Singapore – WTO Third Country Training Programme
In 1996, Singapore signed a Memorandum of Understanding with the WTO to provide joint trade-related courses to developing countries. Since then, we have jointly organised 12 workshops and seminars for 257 government officials from WTO member countries. From 2007, Singapore will host the WTO's Regional Trade Policy Training Course (RTPC) till 2010. The first run of this RTPC course will be attended by 33 participants from the Asia-Pacific region.

See also
Singapore Scholarship for ASEAN

External links
Singapore Cooperation Programme - official website

Singapore government policies